Robert Christian Cramer (born 7 February 1954 in Amsterdam) is a Swiss politician and member of the Green Party of Switzerland. He was educated as a  lawyer at the University of Geneva.

From 1988 to 1990, he was head of the cantonal section Green party of Geneva. Cramer was a member of the municipal council of the city of Geneva from 1995 to 1997 and cantonal council of the Canton of Geneva from 1997 to 2005.

Cramer was elected as a representative of the Canton of Geneva in the Swiss Council of States in the 2007 elections.

References

1954 births
Members of the Council of States (Switzerland)
Living people
Green Party of Switzerland politicians